
Gmina Świerklaniec is a rural gmina (administrative district) in Tarnowskie Góry County, Silesian Voivodeship, in southern Poland.

Villages
Gmina Świerklaniec contains the villages and settlements of Nakło, Nowe Chechło, Orzech and Świerklaniec.

Neighbouring gminas
Gmina Świerklaniec is bordered by the towns of Miasteczko Śląskie, Piekary Śląskie, Radzionków and Tarnowskie Góry, and by the gminas of Bobrowniki and Ożarowice.

References

Swierklaniec
Tarnowskie Góry County